Bruno Gerzeli (October 3, 1925 – November 8, 1982) was an Italian professional football player.

Career
Born in Monfalcone, Gerzeli, a winger, inside forward and centre-forward, started his career in the Serie C side C.R.D.A. Monfalcone, which was the team of his hometown Monfalcone. After World War II, Gerzeli played the 1945-46 Serie C season for Monfalconese (which was the new name of C.R.D.A. Monfalcone); he was then signed by Venezia, a team which was competing in the Serie A. Gerzeli only played one match during the 1946–47 Serie A season, on July 6, 1947, against Triestina. After this one-match experience, he left Venezia and moved to Marzotto Valdagno, coming back to Serie C. He played a Serie B championship in 1948–1949 with Salernitana. In 1952 he decided to leave Italy for Colombia, a nation in which professional football was well-paid because of the so-called El Dorado period. He played for Deportivo Samarios in Colombia along with two other Italian footballers, Corrado Contin and Alessandro Adam. He collected 20 appearances with Samarios, scoring five goals (the first of which was scored against Atlético Nacional on June 1, 1952). In the summer of 1954 he played in the National Soccer League (NSL) with Toronto Hungarians. In 1956, he continued playing in the NSL with Toronto Sparta, and was suspended by the league until 1960 after an incident with a referee in late 1958. In 1963, he served as a player-coach for K.F.C. Estonia in the National Soccer League.

Personal
After he retired from playing, Gerzeli emigrated to Canada in 1954. He married and moved to the United States where he coached the Brigham Young University soccer program. He was originally baptized as a Roman Catholic, but later converted to Mormonism.

Gerzeli died in Salt Lake City on November 8, 1982, due to hepatitis of the liver.

References

External links
Profile at Enciclopediadelcalcio.it

1925 births
1982 deaths
Italian footballers
Italian expatriate footballers
Serie A players
Venezia F.C. players
U.S. Salernitana 1919 players
Unión Magdalena footballers
Association football forwards
A.C.D. Trissino-Valdagno players
Canadian National Soccer League players
Canadian National Soccer League coaches
Expatriate soccer players in Canada
Italian expatriate sportspeople in Canada
Expatriate footballers in Colombia
Italian expatriate sportspeople in Colombia